Maria Vittoria of Savoy (Maria Vittoria Filiberta; 29 September 1814 – 2 January 1874) was a Princess of Savoy by birth and later a  princess of the Two Sicilies by virtue of her marriage to Prince Leopold of Two Sicilies, Count of Syracuse, a younger son King Francis I of the Two Sicilies.

Family
Maria Vittoria was the second child and second-eldest daughter of Prince Joseph Maria of Savoy, Count of Villafranca and his French noble wife Pauline Bénédictine de Quélen de Vauguyon.

Marriage and issue

Maria married Prince Leopold of the Two Sicilies, known as the Count of Syracuse. The count was the fifth son of Francis I of the Two Sicilies and his second wife the Infanta Maria Isabel of Spain. Maria Vittoria and Leopold were married on 16 June 1837 in Naples. Maria and Leopold had one daughter who died a day after her birth.

Princess Isabella of the Two Sicilies (Naples, 23 March 1838 – Naples, 24 March 1838)

References

1814 births
1874 deaths
People from Boulogne-sur-Mer
Princesses of Bourbon-Two Sicilies
Princesses of Savoy
Burials at the Basilica of Santa Chiara